Deliciosa sinvergüenza (in English: Delicious rascal) is a 1990 Mexican comedy film directed by René Cardona Jr. and starring Lucero.

Synopsis 
Lucero's ingenuity and ability to constantly transform and change into different people confuses three crazy international service agents who earnestly pursue the mischievous delinquent, causing hilarious situations.

Cast 
 Lucero as Lucerito
 Pedro Romo as Agent 43
 Pablo Ferrel as Agent 42
 Paco Ibáñez as Agent 41
 Norma Lazareno as Mother superior
 Elvira de la Fuente as Sister Luna

Promotion 
This movie was promoted only in Mexico. After its release was promoted through video stores and eventually television.

Soundtrack
Almost 2 songs from the album Cuéntame were part of the movie.

References

External links 
 

1990 films
1990s Spanish-language films
1990 comedy films
Mexican comedy films
1990s Mexican films